Live in Torino 1977 is a live album by Italian Jazz fusion band Area released in 2004 and recorded in 1977 in Milan, while the band was supporting their fifth album Maledetti (Maudits). Even though the album received praise for the musical content, this album was heavily criticized for its sound quality (it's an audience recording) and for some packaging errors: there is an uncredited performance of "Diforisma Urbano" on "Il Massacro Di Brandeburgo Numero Tre in Sol Maggiore" and "Improvvisazione" is actually "Are(a)zione" with a brief excerpt of "Gioia e Rivoluzione" ).

Track listing

CD 1 

 "Il Massacro Di Brandeburgo Numero Tre in Sol Maggiore" – 12:00 (from 3:10 on, the track is actually "Diforisma Urbano")
 "Gerontocrazia" – 6:48
 "Scum" - 7:27
 "Giro, Giro, Tondo" - 6:48
 "Cometa Rossa" - 9:10

CD 2 

 "La Mela di Odessa" – 16:14
 "Luglio, Agosto, Settembre (Nero)" - 6:20
 "L'Internazionale" – 5:41
 "Improvvisazione" – 16:40 (the track consists of "Are(a)zione" until 15:09. At that point, the band launches into "Gioia e Rivoluzione" which fades out after a minute)

Personnel 
 Patrizio Fariselli - electric piano, piano, clarinet, synthesizer
 Giulio Capiozzo - drums, percussion
 Demetrio Stratos - vocals, organ, steel drums, percussion
 Ares Tavolazzi - bass, trombone
 Paolo Tofani - guitar, synthesizer

References 

Area (band) albums
2005 live albums